Petroselinum is a genus of two parsley species of flowering plants in the family Apiaceae, native to western and southern Europe and northern Africa. 

Plants of this genus are bright green, hairless, biennial and herbaceous; they are rarely annual plants. In the first year, they form a rosette of pinnate to tripinnate leaves and a tap root used as a food store over the winter. In the second year they grow a flowering stem up to 1 m tall with sparser leaves and umbels of white or pinkish to yellowish-green flowers.

Taxonomy 
The generic name comes from rendering the Greek word  petroselinon "rock-celery" into Latin, from  petra "rock, stone" and  selinon "celery". Mycenaean Greek se-ri-no, in Linear B, is the earliest attested form of the word selinon.

Species 
The species of this genus are:
 Petroselinum crispum (garden parsley) from southern Europe and northern Africa (southern Italy, Greece, Algeria, Tunisia). It is an important culinary herb, widely used for flavouring and as a vegetable.

 Petroselinum segetum (corn parsley) from western Europe (Great Britain and the Netherlands south through France to Italy, Spain and Portugal). It is edible with a similar flavour like garden parsley, but it is not widely cultivated. It occurs in grassland, hedgerows, and river banks. In Great Britain, it is confined to lowland regions in southern and central England and southern Wales, and is scarce and declining due to agricultural intensification. It has narrower, more lanceolate leaves than garden parsley, only single pinnate, not tripinnate.

References 

Apioideae
Apioideae genera